"Balader" is a song by Algerian singer Soolking featuring with French rapper Niska released in May 2022. The song peaked at number two on the French Singles Chart.

Charts

Certifications

|-

References

 
2022 singles
2022 songs
French-language songs